is a former Japanese football player. He played for Japan national team.

Club career
Kurata was born in Fujieda, Shizuoka Prefecture on February 1, 1963. After graduating from University of Tsukuba, he joined Japan Soccer League club Honda in 1986. In 1991, he moved to Yomiuri and played in 1 season. The club won 1991 JSL Cup and 1991–92 Japan Soccer League. He retired in 1992.

National team career
In September 1986, he was selected Japan national team for 1986 Asian Games. At this competition, on September 20, he debuted against Nepal. In 1987, he played at 1988 Summer Olympics qualification. He played 6 games for Japan until 1987.

Futsal career
In 1989, Kurata selected Japan national futsal team for 1989 Futsal World Championship in Netherlands.

Coaching career
After retirement, Kurata started coaching career at Avispa Fukuoka in 1995. He mainly served as a coach until 2006. In 2007, he moved to Vissel Kobe. In 2010, he moved to FC Gifu and became a manager. In 2012, he moved to China and signed with Dalian Aerbin. In 2014, he became a manager at the club. He returned to Japan in 2015 and he became a manager for Tochigi SC in July.

Club statistics

National team statistics

Managerial statistics

References

External links
 
 Japan National Football Team Database

1963 births
Living people
University of Tsukuba alumni
Association football people from Shizuoka Prefecture
Japanese footballers
Japan international footballers
Japanese men's futsal players
Japan Soccer League players
Honda FC players
Tokyo Verdy players
Japanese football managers
J2 League managers
J3 League managers
FC Gifu managers
Tochigi SC managers
Dalian Professional F.C. managers
Fujieda MYFC managers
Expatriate football managers in China
Footballers at the 1986 Asian Games
Association football midfielders
Asian Games competitors for Japan
Association football defenders